Valery is a male given name and occasional surname. It is derived from the Latin name Valerius. The Slavic given name Valeriy or Valeri is prevalent in Russia and derives directly from the Latin.

Given name
 Valery Afanassiev, Russian pianist and author
 Valery V. Afanasyev, Russian hockey coach
 Valery Asratyan (1958–1996), Soviet serial killer
 Valery Belenky, Azerbaijani-German former Olympic artistic gymnast
 Valeriy Belousov, Russian decathlete
 Valeri Bojinov, Bulgarian international footballer
 Valery Bryusov, Russian poet
 Valeri Bukrejev, Estonian pole vaulter
 Valeri Bure, Russian ice hockey player
 Valery Chkalov, Russian aircraft test pilot
 Valery Gazzaev, Russian football manager
 Valery Gerasimov, Russian General, the current Chief of the General Staff of the Armed Forces of Russia, and first Deputy Defence Minister. He was appointed by President Vladimir Putin on 9 November 2012. Strategist who conceived the "Gerasimov doctrine" which is currently prevalent in Russian military strategy.
 Valery Gergiev, Ossetian-Russian conductor
 Valéry Giscard d'Estaing, president of the French Republic
 Valeriy Gridnev, Russian painter
 Valery Jacobi, Russian painter
 Valery Karasyov, former Olympic artistic gymnast
 Valeri Karpin, Russian football player
 Valeri Kharlamov, Russian former Olympic hockey player
 Valery Kerdemelidi, former Olympic artistic gymnast
 Valery Khodemchuk (1951–1986), Soviet engineer and first victim of the Chernobyl Disaster
 Valery Kipelov, Russian heavy metal singer and composer (former member of Aria (band) and current leader of Kipelov bands)
 Valeri Kois, Estonian politician
 Valery Larbaud, French author
 Valery Legasov, Russian scientist. He was the chief of the investigation committee of the Chernobyl disaster.
 Valery Leontiev, Russian pop singer
 Valery Likhodey, Russian basketball player
 Valeri Liukin, Kazakh-American former Olympic artistic gymnast and current gymnastics coach. Father of Nastia Liukin
 Valeriy Lobanovskyi, Ukrainian football manager
 Valery Meladze, Russian pop singer
 Valery Mezhlauk, Latvian-German and former Chairman of GOSPLAN from 1934 to 1937
 Valeri Nichushkin, Russian NHL hockey player
 Valery Ortiz, Puerto Rican actress
 Valeri Polyakov, Russian former Cosmonaut
 Valery Postnikov, former Russian hockey player and coach
 Valery Ponomarev, Ukrainian jazz musician
 Valery Perevozchenko, Soviet engineer
 Valeri Qazaishvili, Georgian international footballer
 Valery Rozov, former Russian BASE jumper
 Valery Shary, Belarusian Olympic champion weightlifter
 Valery Sigalevitch, Russian pianist
 Valeriy Sydorenko, Ukrainian boxer
 Valeriy Syutkin, Russian singer
 Valery Todorovsky, Russian film director
 Valeri Zolotukhin, Russian actor

Surname
 Carl Valeri, Australian footballer
 Diego Valeri, Argentinian football player
 Edmond Valléry Gressier, French lawyer
 Franca Valeri, Italian actress
 François Valéry, French singer-songwriter and composer
 Jean Joseph Valéry (1828–1879), French businessman, diplomat and senator.
 Paul Valéry, French author

Fictional characters
Valery, a character in The Sopranos played by Vitali Baganov. Valery was a member of the Russian mob and acquainted with Tony Soprano.

Other
 Valleri, a song performed by The Monkees

See also 

 Valerie (given name)
 Valerii (name)
 Valeriu (given name)
 Valerius (name)
 Valeria (given name)
 Valerian (name)
 Valeriano (name)
 Valerianus (disambiguation)
 Valer (disambiguation)
 Valera (disambiguation)
 Valérien (disambiguation)
 Vale (disambiguation)
 Vallery, France
 Walric, abbot of Leuconay
 Saint-Vaury
 
 

Russian masculine given names